Tom Chatfield (born 1980) is a British author, broadcaster and tech philosopher.

Biography

Chatfield took his BA, MPhil and doctorate degrees and taught at St John's College, Oxford, before beginning work as a writer and editor.

His first book, on the culture of video games, Fun Inc, was published worldwide in 2010. Further books explored digital culture. He is an associate editor at Prospect magazine, Fellow at The School of Life and past guest faculty member at the Said Business School, Oxford, as well as a columnist for the BBC.

A frequent speaker and consultant on technology and new media, he spoke at TED Global 2010 on "7 ways games reward the brain", was lead content designer and writer on Preloaded's game The End, and appears regularly in the British and international media as a commentator. His work is published in over two dozen languages.

Italian think tank LSDP named him among its 100 top global thinkers for his work.

Books

 This Is Gomorrah (2019) Chatfield's debut novel This Is Gomorrah (The Gomorrah Gambit in the US) was published worldwide by Hodder  in July 2019, and is the first of a series of techno-thrillers set in the world of the dark net.
 Critical Thinking (2017) Critical Thinking was published in November 2017 as a lead global title by SAGE Publishing, and offers a comprehensive, accessible guide to critical thinking skills for the 21st century.
 Live This Book! (2015) Live This Book was published in August 2015 by Penguin, and is a print-only journal offering 100 exercises aimed at self-exploration, creativity, and critical thinking about what matters most.
 Netymology (2013) Netymology was published in March 2013 by Quercus, and tells the stories behind 100 of the digital age's most terms and ideas: from the @ and Apple symbols, to grokking, Trojans and zombies.
 How to Thrive in the Digital Age (2012) How to Thrive in the Digital Age was published in May 2012 by Pan Macmillan in association with The School of Life, as part of a six-book series of guides to modern living edited by Alain de Botton. Chatfield's book examines the implications of wired life for contemporary lives, society and culture.
 50 Digital Ideas You Really Need to Know (2011) 50 Digital Ideas You Really Need to Know was published in September 2011 by Quercus, and introduces 50 key ideas for understanding the digital age, ranging from the basics of email and markup languages to location-based services, virtual goods and the semantic web.
 Activism or Slacktivism? (2011) Activism or Slacktivism? was published in July 2011 as a short eBook by Vintage Digital, and examines the impact of new media on politics and political activism.
 Fun Inc (2010) Fun Inc was published in 2010 by Virgin Books in the UK and by Pegasus Books in the US. An investigation of the business, cultural significance and larger lessons to be learned from the video games industry, it addresses popular concerns such as the debate over violence in games, as well as the questions of games as art, as a fundamental human activity, and as an index of ongoing transformations in the social sciences, economics and 21st century life.

References

External links

 
 
 authors@Google Tom Chatfield's lecture at Google on games as learning engines
 Review of Fun Inc for the Guardian newspaper by Steven Poole
 Review of Fun Inc for the Observer newspaper by Naomi Alderman

British writers
British non-fiction writers
1980 births
Living people
Alumni of St John's College, Oxford
British male writers
The School of Life people
Male non-fiction writers